Tirunavaya, also spelled as Thirunavaya, is a town in Malappuram, Kerala. Situated on the northern bank of Bharatappuzha (River Ponnani/Nila or Perar), it is one of major Hindu pilgrimage centres in Kerala. Tirunavaya, home to Tirunavaya Temple (Navamukunda/Vishnu Temple) and temples of Siva and Brahma (Cherutirunavaya Brahma Temple and Siva Temple/Tirunavaya Mahadeva Temple), is one of the most prominent places for bali tarpana on Karkitaka vavu in Kerala.

Tirunavaya seems to be a very sacred place for the Hindus of Kerala from time immemorial. Bharathappuzha at Tirunavaya is considered to assume a special sanctity, because it flows between the temple of Vishnu (Navamukunda) on its right bank and the temple of Brahma and Siva on its left. The village, situated on the fertile river basin, must have been one of the most prominent Brahmin settlement in Kerala. Tirunavaya also hosted the Mamankam, a type of medieval temple festival with huge political significance, in every 12 years.

The Navamukunda Temple is considered one of the 108 original tirupatis (divyadesa) of the Vaishnava alvars. The pitrkarma/pitrkriyas performed at Tirunavaya, a trimūrti sangama, are considered as very sacred. On Karkitaka vavu (amavasi), Hindus from different part of northern Kerala travel to the temple, to perform the pitrkriya (bali tarpana) seeking moksha for their ancestors. According to media, more than 50,000 devotees performed vavu bali at Navamukunda Temple in 2015. Bali rites are also performed at Tirunavaya on the vavu days of Tulam and Kumbham.
 
Tirunavaya Census Town, geographical area: , has a population of 24,790 (2011). The Muslims compose 77.41% of the total number, while Hindus form of 18.30% of the total population. Schedule Caste (SC) constitutes 6.17% while Schedule Tribe (ST) were 0.63% of total population in Tirunavaya CT.

Transportation
 Nearest Airports: Calicut (CCJ) and Cochin International Airport
 Nearest Municipality: Tirur
 Nearest Major Railway Station: Tirunnavaya railway station, Kuttippuram 7 km, Tirur 11 km

References 

Villages in Malappuram district
Tirur area
Hindu pilgrimage sites in India
Hindu holy cities
Tourist attractions in Malappuram district